Igor Bugaenko (born 1981), also known as Ihar Buhaenka, is a Belarusian kickboxer, who has been professionally competing since 2008.

He is the former SUPERKOMBAT Cruiserweight Champion, and two-time Tatneft Arena World Cup winner, in 2008 and 2014.

He was ranked as a top ten middleweight between March 2015 and July 2021.

Kickboxing career

Tatneft Cup winner
Bugaenko began his professional career with Tatneft Cup, entering both the 2008 and 2009 edition of the tournament. He won the 2008 edition with a first-round TKO of Elvin Abbasov in the finals, but lost both the semifinal bout against Semen Shelepov and the 3rd place fight against Sergei Lascenko in the 2009 edition. After losing to Lascenko, Bugaenko went on the worst run of his career, losing five of his next seven fights, four times by stoppage. This poor run of form was snapped at the Tatneft Cup 2013 event, when he scored a first round knockout of Eduardo Maiorino.

SUPERKOMBAT Fighting Championship
He defeated Lorenzo Javier Jorge on November 9, 2013 in a SUPERKOMBAT Cruiserweight Title Eliminator bout and challenged Bogdan Stoica for his Cruiserweight Championship. Fight happened at the SUPERKOMBAT World Grand Prix 2013 Final in Galați, Romania on December 21, and Bugaenko won the title after three round by unanimous judges decision.

Bugaenko earned a place in the 2014 Tatneft Arena Middleweight tournament with decision wins over Vladimir Toktasynov and Martin Pacas in the 1/8 and quarterfinals respectively. He won the semifinal bout against Valentin Slavikovskiy and the final bout against Alexander Vezhevatov in the same manner - by an extra round decision.

Win in Croatia
During the Obračun u Ringu 13 event, Bugaenko participated in the VVWS 95 kg elimination tournament. He defeated Stefan Anđelković by unanimous decision in the semifinals and Pacôme Assi by TKO in the finals, to earn a place in the main VVWS tournament. Bugaenko faced Claudiu Istrate in the semifinals of the main tournament, and won the fight by unanimous decision. He won the tournament title with a first-round stoppage of Alexandru Burduja.

Absolute Championship Berkut
After this tournament win, Bugaenko his next seven fights, all by decision, including notable victories against Redouan Cairo, Luis Tavares, Hicham El Gaoui and Freddy Kemayo. At ACB KB 15, he fought Artem Levin for the inaugural ACB KB Middleweight title. Levin won the fight by decision.

Later career
After his failed title bid, Bugaenko was scheduled to fight Mikhail Chalykh at Zhara Fight Show. He won the fight by decision. At the October 2019 Fair Fight event, he lost to César Almeida by an extra round decision.

Championships and accomplishments

Kickboxing
SUPERKOMBAT Fighting Championship
SUPERKOMBAT Cruiserweight Championship -92 kg/202.8 lb (One time; current)
Tatneft Cup 
 Tatneft Arena World Cup 2014 (+80 kg) Winner
Tatneft Arena World Cup 2008 (+80 kg) Winner
Venum Victory World Series
 2015 VVWS -95 kg Tournament Champion
 2015 VVWS -95 kg Elimination Tournament Champion

Kickboxing record

|-  style="background:#fbb;"
| 2019-10-26 || Loss||align=left| César Almeida || Fair Fight || Russia || Extra Round Decision || 4
|- style="background:#cfc;"
| 2018-05-30 || Win ||align=left| Mikhail Chalykh || Zhara Fight Show || Moscow, Russia || Decision || 3
|-  style="background:#fbb;"
| 2018-04-20 || Loss||align=left| Artem Levin || ACB KB 15: Grand Prix Kitek || Moscow, Russia || Decision || 5 
|-
! style=background:white colspan=9 |
|-
|- style="background:#cfc;"
| 2018-02-24 || Win||align=left| Freddy Kemayo || |ACB KB 13: From Paris with war || France || Decision (Unanimous) || 3
|- style="background:#cfc;"
| 2017-10-07 || Win  || align="left| Hao Guanghua || Wu Lin Feng  || Zhengzhou, China || Decision  || 3
|- 
|-  style="background:#cfc;"
| 2017-07-15 || Win ||align=left| Hicham El Gaoui || ACB KB 10: Russia vs. China || Moscow, Russia || Decision (Unanimous) || 3
|-  style="background:#cfc;"
| 2016-12-10 || Win ||align=left| Maxim Bolotov || KOK World GP in Moldova Vol. 42   || Chisinau, Moldova ||  Decision (Unanimous) ||3 
|- 
|-  style="background:#cfc;"
| 2016-10-16 || Win ||align=left| Luis Tavares || |ACB KB 8: Only The Braves || Hoofddorp, Netherlands || Decision || 4 
|-  style="background:#cfc;"
| 2016-06-04 || Win ||align=left| Redouan Cairo  || |ACB KB 6: Battle in Brussels || Brussels, Belgium || Decision || 3 
|-  style="background:#cfc;"
| 2016-04-16 || Win ||align=left| Bruno Susano || Oktagon 2016: Turin || Torino, Italy || Decision (Unanimous) || 3  
|-
|-  style="background:#cfc;"
| 2015-11-28 || Win ||align=left| Alexandru Burduja || Venum Victory World Series 2015  || Paris, France || TKO || 1    
|-
! style=background:white colspan=9 |
|-  style="background:#cfc;"
| 2015-11-28 || Win ||align=left| Claudiu Istrate || Venum Victory World Series 2015  || Paris, France || Decision (Unanimous) || 3  
|-  style="background:#fbb;"
| 2015-07-30 || Loss ||align=left| Tomáš Hron || Yangame's Fight Night 3 || Prague, Czech Republic || Decision (Unanimous) || 3 
|-  style="background:#cfc;"
| 2015-05-30 || Win ||align=left| Pacôme Assi ||Obračun u Ringu 13, Final || Split, Croatia || TKO (Retirement) || 1
|-
! style=background:white colspan=9 |
|-  style="background:#cfc;"
| 2015-05-30 || Win ||align=left| Stefan Anđelković ||Obračun u Ringu 13, Semi Finals || Split, Croatia || Decision (Unanimous) || 3 
|-  style="background:#fbb;"
| 2015-04-10 || Loss ||align=left| Ondřej Hutník || Heroes Gate 14 || Prague, Czech Republic || Decision (Unanimous) || 3 
|-  style="background:#fbb;"
| 2015-02-01 || Loss ||align=left| Hesdy Gerges || Kunlun Fight 19: The Return of the King  || Guangzhou, China || TKO || 2   
|-  style="background:#cfc;"
| 2014-09-13 || Win ||align=left| Alexander Vezhevatov || Tatneft Cup 2014 final || Kazan, Russia || Ex. R. Decision (Unanimous) || 4
|-
! style=background:white colspan=9 |
|-  style="background:#cfc;"
| 2014-07-18 || Win ||align=left| Valentin Slavikovskiy || Tatneft Cup 2014 1/2 final || Kazan, Russia || Ex. R. Decision (Unanimous) || 4
|-  style="background:#cfc;"
| 2014-05-28 || Win ||align=left| Martin Pacas || Tatneft Cup 2014 - 2nd selection 1/4 final || Kazan, Russia || Ex. R. Decision (Unanimous) || 4
|-  style="background:#cfc;"
| 2014-03-22 || Win ||align=left| Moises Baute || FCK  || Tenerife, Spain || Decision (unanimous) || 3
|-  style="background:#fbb;"
| 2014-03-01 || Loss ||align=left| Ivan Pavle || Nitrianska Noc Bojovnikov 2014, Semi Finals  || Nitra, Slovakia || Decision (unanimous) || 3
|-  style="background:#cfc;"
| 2014-02-15 || Win ||align=left| Vladimir Toktasynov || Tatneft Cup 2014 - 3rd selection 1/8 final  || Kazan, Russia || Ex. R. Decision || 4
|-  style="background:#cfc;"
| 2013-12-21 || Win ||align=left| Bogdan Stoica || SUPERKOMBAT World Grand Prix 2013 Final || Galați, Romania || Decision (unanimous)|| 3 
|-
! style=background:white colspan=9 |
|-  style="background:#cfc;"
| 2013-11-09 || Win ||align=left| Jorge Loren || SUPERKOMBAT World Grand Prix 2013 Final Elimination || Ploiești, Romania || Decision (unanimous) || 3  
|-
! style=background:white colspan=9 |
|-  style="background:#cfc;"
| 2013-02-22 || Win ||align=left| Vladimir Oleynik || Knockout Show (Muaythai Night) || Moscow, Russia || Decision (unanimous) || 3  
|-  style="background:#cfc;"
| 2012-12-01 || Win ||align=left| Eduardo Maiorino || Tatneft Cup 2013 - 2nd selection 1/8 final || Kazan, Russia || KO (uppercut) || 1
|-  style="background:#fbb;"
| 2012-05-26 || Loss ||align=left| Vladimir Mineev || Battle of Ural || Verkhnyaya Pyshma, Russia || RTD (corner retirement) || 3
|-  style="background:#cfc;"
| 2012-03-11 || Win ||align=left| Shamil Abasov || Best Fighter - Russia vs. Belarus || Samara, Russia || Decision (unanimous) || 3 
|-  style="background:#fbb;"
| 2011-12-23 || Loss ||align=left| Alexei Papin || Rod Fighting - Shield and Sword 1  || Moscow, Russia || Ext. R. Decision || 4 
|-  style="background:#fbb;"
| 2011-02-12 || Loss ||align=left| Vladimir Mineev || W5 League || Moscow, Russia || Decision (unanimous) || 3
|-  style="background:#fbb;"
| 2011-01-28 || Loss ||align=left| Anton Chuvasov || UAMA: Warrior's Honor 5 || Kharkov, Ukraine  || KO || 
|-
! style=background:white colspan=9 |
|-  style="background:#fbb;"
| 2010-03-28 || Loss ||align=left| Tomasz Sarara || K-1 World Grand Prix 2010 in Warsaw, Quarter finals || Warsaw, Poland || TKO || 3 
|-  style="background:#cfc;"
| 2010-03-19 || Win ||align=left| Slavo Polugić || K-1 World Max 2010 - East European Tournament || Minsk, Belarus || Decision || 3 
|-  style="background:#fbb;"
| 2009-10-23 || Loss ||align=left| Sergei Lascenko || Tatneft Cup 2009 Final || Kazan, Russia ||  TKO || 5
|-
! style=background:white colspan=9 |
|-  style="background:#fbb;"
| 2009-09-16 || Loss ||align=left| Semen Shelepov || Tatneft Cup 2009 Semifinal || Kazan, Russia || Decision || 4
|-  style="background:#cfc;"
| 2009-05-26 || Win ||align=left| Abdülhalik Magomedov || Tatneft Cup 2009 - 2nd selection 1/4 final || Kazan, Russia || Decision || 4
|-  style="background:#cfc;"
| 2008-12-19 || Win ||align=left|  Achilov || Tatneft Cup 2009 - 2nd selection 1/8 final || Kazan, Russia || KO || 3
|-  style="background:#cfc;"
| 2008-08-29 || Win ||align=left| Elvin Abbasov || Tatneft Cup 2008 Final || Kazan, Russia || RTD (corner retirement) || 1
|-
! style=background:white colspan=9 |
|-  style="background:#cfc;"
| 2008-05-29 || Win ||align=left| Sergey Pantyuhin || Tatneft Cup 2008 Semifinal || Kazan, Russia || KO (left hook) || 1
|-  style="background:#cfc;"
| 2008-02-08 || Win ||align=left| Andrey Kirsanov || Tatneft Cup 2008 - 4th selection 1/8 final || Kazan, Russia || Decision || 4
|-
| colspan=9 | Legend:

See also
List of male kickboxers

References

External links
Profile on FightLife

Belarusian male kickboxers
Kunlun Fight kickboxers
SUPERKOMBAT kickboxers
Middleweight kickboxers
Sportspeople from Minsk